Dead Heat may refer to:

 Dead heat, in racing sports, an unresolvable tie

Film and television 
Dead Heat (1988 film), an American comedy horror cop film
Dead Heat (2002 film), an American crime comedy film
"Dead Heat" (Murder, She Wrote), a 1985 television episode

Literature 
Dead Heat (Rosenberg novel), a 2008 Last Jihad novel by Joel C. Rosenberg
Dead Heat (Stone novel), a 1996 novel by Del Stone Jr.
Dead Heat, a 1984 Michael Spraggue novel by Linda Barnes
Dead Heat, a 2015 Alpha and Omega novel by Patricia Briggs
Dead Heat, a 2007 novel by Dick Francis and Felix Francis

See also 
Heat death (disambiguation)
List of dead heat horse races
Photo finish
Tie (draw)